Cataprosopus chapalis is a species of snout moth in the genus Cataprosopus. It was described by Joseph de Joannis in 1929 and is known from China.

References

Moths described in 1929
Megarthridiini